David or Dave Moon may refer to:

 David A. Moon, American computer scientist and Lisp developer
 David Moon (historian), British professor
 David Moon (politician) (born 1979), Maryland legislator 
 David Moon (rugby league), Australian rugby league player
 David Moon (Jersey politician), candidate in the 1996 Jersey general election
 Dave Moon, American football player chosen in the 1949 NFL Draft
 Dave Moon, British television editor of Freshers
 Dave Moon, Canadian curler on the winning team in the 2003 Canadian Masters Curling Championships
 David Moon, cast member of the Impractical Jokers UK TV series
 David Moon, a minor character on Frasier, an American sitcom

See also
 Moon (surname), including a list of people with the name
 David Mooney (disambiguation)